Judgement, also known as , was a professional wrestling event promoted by DDT Pro-Wrestling (DDT). It took place on March 25, 1997, in Tokyo, Japan, at the Hibiya Radio City. It was the first event under the Judgement name and also the first ever pay-per-view hosted by DDT.

Storylines
Judgement featured four professional wrestling matches that involved different wrestlers from pre-existing scripted feuds and storylines. Wrestlers portrayed villains, heroes, or less distinguishable characters in the scripted events that built tension and culminated in a wrestling match or series of matches.

Results

References

External links
The official DDT Pro-Wrestling website

1
1997 in professional wrestling
Professional wrestling in Tokyo